The 1966 Torneo Descentralizado was the 50th season of the highest division of Peruvian football. This season marked the first time the Primera División was named the Descentralizado because teams outside Lima and Callao were invited for the first time making it the first national championship in Peru. The four teams invited to play in the inaugural national championship were Melgar of Arequipa, Octavio Espinosa of Ica, Grau of Piura, and Alfonso Ugarte de Chiclín of Trujillo.

The first match of the season was played on 13 August 1966 between Universitario and Mariscal Sucre in the Estadio Nacional. Shortly after this match, the first match to feature a team outside the Lima and Callao region was between Sporting Cristal and Alfonso Ugarte in the same stadium on the same day.

The champion was Universitario. Four teams were relegated at the end of the season. Carlos Concha was relegated to the 1967 Segunda División as the last placed team. In addition, Octavio Espinosa, Alfonso Ugarte, and Melgar were relegated as they needed to place seventh or higher to remain in the first division. They needed to play the 1967 Copa Perú to attain promotion to the first division.

Teams

League table

Season statistics

Top scorers

Scoring
First goal of the season – Héctor Chumpitaz for Universitario against Mariscal Sucre (13 August 1966)

References

External links
Peru 1966 season at RSSSF

Peru1
1
Peruvian Primera División seasons